Each Pancam is one of two electronic stereo cameras on Mars Exploration Rovers Spirit and Opportunity. It has a filter wheel assembly that enables it to view different wavelengths of light and the pair of Pancams are mounted beside two NavCams on the MER camera bar assembly.

According to Cornell University it can work with Mini-TES to analyze surroundings.

According to a paper about Mars by JPL, the Pancam system can achieve an angular resolution of 300 microradians, which is three times better than the human eye. It can observe 14 spectral bands, and with two side-by side cameras can generate stereoscopic views of Mars, supporting the creation of large Mars panoramas in excess of 10 Gbit uncompressed. Spirit rover took the highest resolution image ever taken on the surface of another planet up to that time when it landed in 2004.

Optics
The focal length of the camera is 43 mm with a field of view (FOV) of 16° x 16°. The two cameras are separated by 30 cm and are mounted upside-down relative to each other.

Charge-Coupled Device
A 1024 x 2048 frame transfer Charge-Coupled Device (CCD) detector built by Mitel is used for both cameras. The CCD is front-side illuminated and does not use any anti-reflex or UV-enhancing coatings. Half of the chip is used for storage and readout and is therefore shielded from illumination.

Electronics
An Actel Field Programmable Gate Array (FPGA) RT1280 provides the necessary computational abilities for the camera. The signal of the CCD is transformed into a 12-bit digital signal before data processing.

Filter wheel
The left camera has filters with the following wavelength: (739, 753, 673, 601,  535, 482, 432, 440 nm), while the
right camera has the filters for:(436, 754, 803, 864, 904, 934, 1009, 880 nm). Each filter wheel is driven by a stepper motor to provide rotation of the wheel.

Calibration target

The calibration target on the rover is also part of the camera system and contains several areas. Polished areas to reflect the Martian sky, areas with known reflectivity and at the four corners color targets made from silicone. The inorganic pigments for the corners were hematite, goethite, chromium oxide and cobalt aluminate.  The calibration target is part of the sundial assembly.

See also
Astrionics
Comparison of embedded computer systems on board the Mars rovers
Curiosity rover
Hazcam
List of NASA cameras on spacecraft
Mars
Navcam

References

External links
PanCam
Mars Exploration Rover Athena Panoramic Camera (Pancam) investigation

Mars Exploration Rover mission
Mars imagers